The Rainbow Special was a "fast train" operating over the Missouri Pacific between Kansas City, Missouri, and Hot Springs, Arkansas, (later extended to Little Rock, Arkansas). The service was introduced in 1921.

References

Passenger trains of the Missouri Pacific Railroad
Railway services introduced in 1921